The 2016–17 Slovenian First League (known as the Liga NLB for sponsorship reasons) was the 26th season of the 1. A liga, Slovenia's premier handball league.

Team information 

The following 14 clubs competed in the 1. A liga during the 2016–17 season:

Regular season

Standings

Results

Championship Round

Standings

Results

Relegation Round

Standings

Results

References

External links
 Slovenian Handball Federaration 

2016–17 domestic handball leagues
Slovenian First League
Slovenian First League
Handball competitions in Slovenia